Annelie Botes (born Annelie Basson; June 1957) is a South African writer in the Afrikaans language.

Life 
Annelie Basson was born on a farm  near Grootfontein near the village of Uniondale (Cape Province). She holds a teaching degree in music (piano) from the University of South Africa (1986).

She is the author of fifty short stories and novels published in magazines Huisgenoot, Sarie and Rooi Rose. She writes a regular column in Volksblad and Die Burger.

In November 2010, in an interview with the newspaper Rapport, she caused controversy by declaring that she did not like black people or understand them. Following the statements, the newspaper Die Burger decided to withdraw her column. She refused to retract her remarks and to condemn them. She added that it was "perhaps unfair" to put all black people in the same category.

Awards 
 2010 K Sello Duiker Memorial Literary Award for Thula-thula

Works 
 Tabernakel, (2010) 
 Thula-thula, (2009)- prix K Sello Duikerde la littérature sud-africaine 2010 

 Trousseaukis, (2008) 
 Sabbatsreis, (2007) 
 Broodsonde, (2006) 
 Raaiselkind, (2001). 
  
 Klawervier, (1997, 2004) - Prix ATKV. 
  
 Berg der verlorenen Träume (2002) 
Klavertje Vier.
 Trippel Sewe, (1995, 2007)

References

External links 
 Who's Who

Afrikaans-language writers
1957 births
Living people
University of South Africa alumni
People from the Western Cape